Afro-Russians are people of African descent that have migrated to and settled in Russia. The Metis Foundation estimates that there were about 30,000 Afro-Russians in 2013.

Terminology
Representatives of African peoples in the Russian language have been commonly called . In the Russian language the word does not carry a negative connotation, but that does not mean it is not offensive to others from other cultures.

History

Russian Empire 

There was never an observable  number of people of African descent in Russia, even after Western European colonization of the continent. For centuries Russia was too isolated to interact with Africa. Russia's non-involvement in the colonization of Africa or the Atlantic slave trade prevented it from developing significant relationships with African tribes or colonies. Despite this, Abram Petrovich Gannibal, a Russian of princely African descent, became a general and nobleman in the Russian Empire.  After being kidnapped from Logone (in contemporary Cameroon) by Ottoman forces as a boy, he was sold to Russian diplomat Fedor Golovin in 1704 and gifted to Tsar Peter the Great, who freed and adopted him. As an adult, he rose to nobility, and served the Russian Empire in both civil and military capacities.  He is also a maternal great-grandfather to the famed Russian poet Alexander Pushkin.

Early Soviet period 

After the revolution several African-American families came to the Soviet Union under the auspices of the Comintern. Among them were Oliver John Golden and his wife Bertha Bialek, bringing with them a group of 16 Afro-American experts in the cultivation of cotton; well-known African-American poet Langston Hughes with a group of 22 filmmakers; Paul Robeson with his family; and many others. Some of them stayed in Russia and their descendants still live there.

Post-War, the Festival Children 
When African nations gained independence from colonialism, the Soviet Union offered scholarships to young people from these nations. About 400,000 Africans studied in the former Soviet Union between the late 1950s and 1990. The first significant arrival of Africans was for the 6th World Festival of Youth and Students held in Moscow in 1957. The mixed race African descended children were called festival children because of their appearance, timing of their birth, and lack of a father figure. Many Africans also attended the Peoples' Friendship University of Russia.

Notable Afro-Russians 

 Lyukman Adams (born 1988) – half-Nigerian triple jumper
 Aleksandr Alumona (born 1983) – half-Nigerian footballer
 Coretti Arle-Titz (1881–1951) – black American born actress and singer
 Allan Dugblei (born 1985) – half-Ghanaian footballer
 Abram Gannibal (1696–1781) – statesman, military leader, and politician
 Ivan Gannibal (1735–1801) – military leader, the son of Abram Gannibal
Alexander Pushkin (1799–1837) – Russian poet, playwright and novelist, a descendant of Abram Gannibal
 Alice Edun – half-Nigerian singer
 Nkeirouka Ezekh (born 1983) – half-Nigerian Olympic curler
 Brian Idowu (born 1992) – three quarters-Nigerian Russian Premier League footballer
 Victor Keyru (born 1984) – Sierra Leonian-Russian basketball player
 Yelena Khanga (born 1962) – Russian journalist and TV anchor of Zanzibari-American descent
 Stanislav Lebamba (born 1988) – half-Congolese footballer
 Cyrille Makanda (born 1980) – half-Cameroonian basketball player
 Avua-Siav Leo Nelson (born 1980) – half-Ghanaian footballer
 Peter Odemwingie (born 1981) – half-Nigerian footballer
 Adessoye Oyewole (born 1982) – half-Nigerian footballer
 James Lloydovich Patterson (born 1933) – Russian child actor, naval officer, and poet of African-American and Ukrainian descent
 Jean Sagbo (born 1959) – Beninese-Russian politician. Elected councilman of the town of Novozavidovo
 Jerry-Christian Tchuissé (born 1975) – Cameroonian-Russian footballer
 Emiliya Turey (born 1984) – part-Sierra Leonean handball player
 Grigory Siyatvinda (born 1970) – part-Zambian actor
 Elladj Baldé (born 1990) – half-Guinean figure skater
 Isabel dos Santos (born 1973) – half-Angolan businesswoman
 Greta Onieogou (born 1991) – half Nigerian half Russian Canadian actress
 Artyom Ntumba (born 2003) - half Congolese, half Russian footballer

Social movements 
Afro-Russian social movements have emerged in recent years as a response to the discrimination and marginalization experienced by people of Russian-African descent. 

The Sputnik Association is a social movement founded in London, UK in 2006 by a group of Russian emigrants and Afro-Russian people. The association was created to provide a platform for Russian emigrants and mixed-race Russian people living abroad to connect and celebrate their shared cultural heritage.

See also

 Afro-Abkhazians

References

External links
 Funmetis a Foundation for Afro-Russian Children
  Article "Afro-Russians" from Rossiyskaya Gazeta
  Article "Black Man" from Online Vremya
 Василий из "Чернобыля". История реального ликвидатора [ENG SUBS]

African diaspora in Europe
Ethnic groups in Russia
Russian